Lukas Gruener (born 18 October 1981, in Zams) is an Austrian snowboarder. He competed in the men's snowboard cross event at the 2006 Winter Olympics, placing nineteenth, and the 2010 Winter Olympics, placing sixth.

References

1981 births
Living people
Austrian male snowboarders
Olympic snowboarders of Austria
Snowboarders at the 2006 Winter Olympics
Snowboarders at the 2010 Winter Olympics
People from Zams
Sportspeople from Tyrol (state)